Pearling may refer to:

Relating to actual pearls
 Pearl farming, which creates cultured pearls
 Pearl hunting, the practice of diving for pearls and mother of pearl (nacre)
 Pearling in Western Australia, which covers both pearl hunting and pearl farming

Other uses
 Pearling, a decorative metal surface finishing technique
 Pearling (body modification), a form of genital beading
 Pearl growing, a search method where the information in one article is used to find further relevant articles on a subject
 An alternative spelling for purling, a term in knitting
 Debranning, removing the bran of pearl millet

See also
Mother of pearl (nacre), the iridescent substance of which pearls and the inner layer of some shells are composed